Krasnoglinsky City District is a district (raion) of the city of Samara, Samara Oblast, Russia. Population: 

There is a ski resort in the city district.

References

City districts of Samara